Cristina Maestre Martín de Almagro is a Spanish politician of the Spanish Socialist Workers' Party (PSOE) who has been serving as a Member of the European Parliament since 2019.

Political career
Maestre served as municipal councillor in Daimiel from 2003 to 2015 to and as member of the Senate from 2004 to 2011.

In the European Parliament, Maestre has been serving on the Committee on Petitions and the Committee on Regional Development. In addition to her committee assignments, she is part of the Parliament's delegation for relations with China. She is also a member of the European Parliament Intergroup on Small and Medium-Sized Enterprises (SMEs).

References

Year of birth missing (living people)
Living people
MEPs for Spain 2019–2024
21st-century women MEPs for Spain
Municipal councillors in the province of Ciudad Real
Spanish Socialist Workers' Party MEPs
Members of the Senate of Spain